Calvin Pickard (born April 15, 1992) is a Canadian professional ice hockey goaltender who is currently playing for the Bakersfield Condors in the American Hockey League (AHL) while under contract to the Edmonton Oilers of the National Hockey League (NHL).

Pickard was drafted by the Colorado Avalanche in the second round (49th overall) of the 2010 NHL Entry Draft. He played his junior hockey with the Seattle Thunderbirds of the Western Hockey League (WHL). He was the first selection by the Vegas Golden Knights during the 2017 NHL Expansion Draft. His older brother, Chet, also a goaltender, was drafted in the first round of the 2008 NHL Entry Draft by the Nashville Predators.

Playing career

Junior
Pickard began his major junior career with the Seattle Thunderbirds of the WHL in 2008–09. Despite only totalling 16 wins in 62 games with the Thunderbirds in his second season, Pickard posted a save percentage of 0.914 and was named to the 2010 WHL West First All-Star Team. Although ranked as the top North American goaltender by central scouting, Pickard was the third goaltender chosen in the 2010 NHL Entry Draft, when selected in the second round, 49th overall, by the Colorado Avalanche. During the 2010–11 season with the Thunderbirds, Pickard was invited to take part in Canada's National Junior Team selection camp for the 2011 World Junior Championships. He was not selected for the final roster.

Professional

Colorado Avalanche
On March 25, 2011, it was announced that Pickard signed a three-year entry level contract with the Colorado Avalanche. He spent the remainder of the season with their American Hockey League affiliate team, the Lake Erie Monsters. At the outset of the 2011–12 season, Pickard was assigned to the Seattle Thunderbirds, where he finished his junior career. The 2012–13 season was his first full season as a professional, and Pickard played in 47 games for Lake Erie, recording 20 wins.

In the 2014–15 season, Pickard began the year with the Monsters but was recalled to the Colorado Avalanche on October 16, 2014 after Semyon Varlamov was placed on injured reserve, he made his NHL debut the same day against the Ottawa Senators as he had to come in for Reto Berra who was injured in a collision; Pickard allowed four goals on 27 shots in a 5–3 loss. Pickard was sent back to the Lake Erie Monsters on October 25 but was recalled on November 18 after Semyon Varlamov suffered a groin injury. Pickard earned his first win on November 22 after coming in to relieve an ineffective Reto Berra, Pickard stopped all 17 shots he faced in an eventual 4-3 Overtime win. After more poor play from Berra, Pickard became the starting goaltender and continued in impressive form until Semyon Varlamov permanently returned to the team, after which Pickard became the team's primary backup goaltender. Pickard was returned to Lake Erie on December 28, in order to resume a starting goaltender role. In the 2015–16 season Pickard began the year with Colorado's new AHL affiliate the San Antonio Rampage, he was recalled early on in the season when Semyon Varlamov suffered a groin injury. He would return to the club in late December when Reto Berra injured his ankle, Pickard recorded his first NHL shutout on January 16, 2016 against the New Jersey Devils.

As a restricted free agent, Pickard was signed to his first one-way deal with the Avalanche, agreeing to a two-year, $2 million contract on July 5, 2016. In his first full season in the NHL in 2016–17, Pickard was slated as the backup goaltender, however with an early season-ending injury suffered to Varlamov, Pickard was thrust into the starting role for the Avalanche. He established a career high in making 50 appearances, leading the last placed Avalanche in save percentage, goals against average and wins.

Expansion draft selection, waiver exchanges
In the off-season, having been exposed at the 2017 NHL Expansion Draft, Pickard was the first player selected by the Vegas Golden Knights on June 21, 2017. Pickard was poised to be the Golden Knight's backup behind Marc-André Fleury heading into their inaugural season, and even went as far as holding a contest with Vegas fans to design his goaltender mask. However, on October 3, the team claimed goaltender Malcolm Subban off waivers. With the Golden Knights deciding to go with a tandem of Fleury and Subban instead, Pickard was placed on waivers on October 5, in order to be sent to the team's AHL affiliate, the Chicago Wolves. He cleared the following day, but a few hours after clearing, Pickard was traded to the Toronto Maple Leafs in exchange for a 2018 sixth-round draft pick and Tobias Lindberg. As he had already cleared waivers, Pickard was immediately assigned to the Maple Leafs affiliate, the Toronto Marlies. On April 15, 2018, Pickard, and fellow Marlies goaltender Garret Sparks, were awarded the Harry "Hap" Holmes Memorial Award. After Pickard helped the Marlies win their first Calder Cup, he signed a one-year $800,000 contract extension to stay with the organization.

During the 2018–19 pre-season, Sparks was chosen to be the Maple Leafs' backup, forcing Pickard to be put on waivers on October 1, 2018. He was claimed the following day by the Philadelphia Flyers.

On November 23, 2018, Pickard had the fourth shutout of his career and his first with the Philadelphia Flyers in a 4–0 victory over the New York Rangers in the Flyers' traditional Black Friday matinee. The following day, he surrendered four goals on six shots against the Toronto Maple Leafs, and was pulled from the net in favor of Anthony Stolarz about twelve minutes into the contest. He did not start another game with the Flyers. With a .863% save percentage and a poor 4.01 goals against average, Pickard was once again placed on waivers on November 28. The following day, the Arizona Coyotes claimed Pickard off waivers. Remaining with the Coyotes as the club's third choice goaltender, Pickard made six appearances for the club, unable to win a game.

Detroit Red Wings
As a free agent from Arizona, Pickard opted to sign a two-year, $1.5 million contract with the Detroit Red Wings on July 1, 2019, his fifth team in two years.

After a strong pre-season showing, Pickard was still assigned to Detroit's affiliate, the Grand Rapids Griffins, with whom he played the majority of the campaign. He received the AHL Player of the Week honor for the week of January 5. He was recalled to the Red Wings on three separate occasions after goaltenders Jimmy Howard and Jonathan Bernier went down with minor injuries. Pickard appeared in three games for the Red Wings, going winless and allowing 15 goals with a 5.46 GAA. Pickard was returned to Grand Rapids to assist in their playoff push on January 23, 2020. Less than two months later, the season was indefinitely suspended due to the COVID-19 pandemic.

On December 1, 2020, prior to the 2020–21 NHL season, Detroit loaned Pickard to the Vienna Capitals of the ICE Hockey League to condition following the eight month break. He had a 3–3 record before being recalled to Detroit on January 3, 2021. Pickard was waived following training camp for the purpose of assignment to their taxi squad. Pickard had a quiet season, only manning Detroit's crease six times, going 2–1–1. Although, he provided one of the bright spots of the Red Wings' year as he earned back-to-back victories against the Columbus Blue Jackets in March.

On July 28, 2021, the Red Wings signed Pickard to a one-year contract extension.

Edmonton Oilers
On July 13, 2022, Pickard as a free agent was signed a two-year, two-way contract with the Edmonton Oilers.

International play

Following a second successful season as a backup with the Avalanche, Pickard was selected for his first international tournament for Canada at the 2016 World Championships in Russia. He played two round-robin games for Canada, winning both times, en route to a gold medal.

Personal life
Calvin was born in Moncton, New Brunswick and moved to Winnipeg, Manitoba when he was eight. Pickard's older brother, Chet, is also a professional goaltender, drafted by the Nashville Predators and currently playing with German club Grizzlys Wolfsburg in the Deutsche Eishockey Liga (DEL).

Career statistics

Regular season and playoffs

International

Awards and honors

References

External links

 

1992 births
Living people
Arizona Coyotes players
Bakersfield Condors players
Canadian expatriate ice hockey players in the United States
Canadian ice hockey goaltenders
Colorado Avalanche draft picks
Colorado Avalanche players
Detroit Red Wings players
Grand Rapids Griffins players
Ice hockey people from New Brunswick
Lake Erie Monsters players
Philadelphia Flyers players
San Antonio Rampage players
Seattle Thunderbirds players
Sportspeople from Moncton
Ice hockey people from Winnipeg
Toronto Maple Leafs players
Toronto Marlies players
Tucson Roadrunners players
Vienna Capitals players